Sergej Braun (born July 17, 1989) is a German kickboxer and karateka, currently competing in the middleweight division of Glory.

As of December 2022, Braun is ranked as the ninth best middleweight in the world by Beyond Kick and sixth best by Combat Press. He first entered both rankings in October 2022.

Professional kickboxing career

Mix Fight
Braun challenged Lorand Sachs for the WKU Middleweight K-1 championship at Apache Fight Night on October 1, 2013. He won the fight by a second-round knockout. He mad his first title defense against Taylan Yesil on June 7, 2014. He won the fight by unanimous decision.

Braun was scheduled to participate in the 2017 Mix Fight -78.5 kg Tournament, which was held at Mix Fight Gala 21 on May 6, 2017. He faced Akam Tarageh in the semifinals of the one-day tournament. Braun won the fight by unanimous decision and advanced to finals, where he faced the Lion Fight Super Middleweight champion. He lost the final bout by a first-round knockout.
 
Braun faced Yohan Lidon at DSF Kickboxing Challenge 13 on March 9, 2018. He lost the fight by a second-round knockout. Braun next faced Shkodran Veseli at Enfusion 64 on April 21, 2018. He lost the fight by a first-round technical knockout. Braun was booked to face Arian Sadikovic at Mix Fight Championship 25 on December 1, 2018. He lost the fight by a narrowly contested split decision.

Braun faced Stipe Mrsic at Fightarena 5 on May 11, 2019. He won the fight by a first-round technical knockout. Braun was scheduled to face Juri De Sousa in an -80 kg Mix Fight title eliminator, which was held at Mix Fight Championship 26 on June 22, 2019. He lost the fight by unanimous decision.

Braun ext faced Mustafa Genc at CWS Fight Night 5 on October 26, 2019. He won the fight by unanimous decision.

Braun took part in the 2019 Mix Fight welterweight (-77 kg) tournament. He faced Lukasz Plawecki in the semifinals of the one-day tournament, held at Mix Fight Championship 27 on December 7, 2019, and was able to win by a third-round knockout. Braun captured the tournament title with a third-round head kick knockout of Brice Kombou in the finals.

Senshi
After capturing the welterweight Mix Fight tournament title, Braun was booked to face Blokland Guillermo at Battle Of Barock on February 1, 2020. He won the fight by unanimous decision. Braun returned to Senshi for his second and final fight of the year, as he faced Daniel Manole at SENSHI 6 on August 21, 2020. He needed just 40 seconds to stop Manole with a spinning back kick.

Braun challenged the WAKO-Pro World K-1 Light Heavyweight (-81.4 kg) champion Aleksander Menković at SENSHI 7 on February 27, 2021. He won the fight by a third-round knockout. Braun knocked his opponent down twice prior to the stoppage, with both knockdowns happening in the third round, first time with a left hook and the second time with a right uppercut. The fight was finally stopped after he knocked Menković down with a head kick, which left the Serbian unable to beat rise from the canvas.

Braun was expected to face the WAKO-Pro World K-1 Super Middleweight champion Nikola Todorovic in a non-title bout on Senshi 8 on May 22, 2021. Braun withdrew from the fight after testing positive for COVID-19. Braun instead faced Samuel Dbili at SENSHI 9 on July 10. He won the fight by a dominant unanimous decision.

Braun was once again booked to face Nikola Todorovic in a non-title bout at SENSHI 10 on December 3, 2021. Todorovic later withdrew from the bout, after testing positive for COVID-19, and was replaced by Assane Bafeta. Braun won the fight by a third-round knockout. He dropped Bafeta with a short left hook, and although Bafeta was able to beat the eight-count, he was unsteady on his feet which prompted the referee to wave the bout off.

Braun and Nikola Todorovic were scheduled to fight for the third time at SENSHI 11 on February 26, 2022. Braun won the fight by unanimous decision. He scored the sole knockdown of the fight late in the third round, although he was unable to finish the Serbian. Braun next faced Chico Kwasi at Super Cup Kickboxing 2 on April 30, 2022. Kwasi snapped Braun's eight-fight winning streak, as he won the fight by unanimous decision. Braun was however able to rebounded from this loss with a unanimous decision win over Daniel Krost at Prestige Championship 2 on June 4, 2022.

Glory
Braun made his Glory debut against Michael Boapeah at Glory: Collision 4 on October 8, 2022. He won the fight by unanimous decision. Braun scored the sole knockdown of the fight in the third round, as he dropped Boapeah with a left hook in the final minute of the fight.

Braun made his first WAKO-Pro World Light Heavyweight (-81.4 kg) title defense against Baris Turkmen at Battle Of Barock 2 on October 29, 2022. He retained the title by a second-round technical knockout.

Braun faced the #2 ranked Glory middleweight contender Serkan Ozcaglayan at Glory 83 on February 11, 2023. He lost the fight by a fourth-round knockout.

Championships and accomplishments

Kickboxing
World Association of Kickboxing Organizations
2021 WAKO-Pro World K-1 Light Heavyweight (-81.4 kg) Championship
One successful title defense
Mix Fight Championship
2019 Mix Fight Welterweight (-77 kg) Tournament Winner
All Fight System Organization
2019 AFSO Super Light Heavyweight (-82 kg) Championship
World Kickboxing and Karate Union
2013 WKU European Middleweight (-85 kg) K-1 Championship
2014 WKU World Middleweight (-85 kg) K-1 Championship
One successful title defense 
World Sport Fight Martial Arts Council
2014 WFMC Middleweight (-84.6 kg) Championship
World Kickboxing Federation
2012 WKF -81 kg Championship

Karate
International Federation of Karate
 2013 IFK World Open Middleweight (-80 kg) 3rd place
Kyokushin Union (IKO Kyokushinkaikan Rengokai)
 2015 Rengokai World Cup -80 kg 3rd place
WKO Shinkyokushinkai
 3x Shinkyokushin Dutch Open Middleweight Winner (2013, 2014, 2015)
 2014 Shinkyokushin West European Championship Diamond Cup Middleweight Winner
 2016 Shinkyokushin West European Championship Diamond Cup Middleweight 3rd place

Professional kickboxing record

|- style="background:#fbb;"
| 2023-02-11|| Loss||align=left| Serkan Ozcaglayan || Glory 83 || Essen, Germany || KO (Left hook) ||2  ||2:40 

|-  style="background:#cfc"
| 2022-10-29 || Win ||align=left| Baris Turkmen || Battle Of Barock 2|| Fulda, Germany || TKO (Punches) || 2 ||2:07
|-
! style=background:white colspan=9 |

|-  style="background:#cfc"
| 2022-10-08 || Win ||align=left| Michael Boapeah || Glory: Collision 4 || Arnhem, Netherlands || Decision (Majority) || 3 || 3:00 
|-
|-  style="background:#cfc"
| 2022-06-04 || Win ||align=left| Daniel Krost || Prestige Championship 2 || Heilbronn, Germany || Decision (Unanimous) || 3 || 3:00
|-
|-  style="background:#fbb"
| 2022-04-30 || Loss ||align=left| Chico Kwasi || Super Cup Kickboxing 2 || Erzhausen, Germany || Decision (Unanimous) || 3 || 3:00
|-
|-  style="background:#cfc"
| 2022-02-26 || Win ||align=left| Nikola Todorovic || SENSHI 11 || Varna, Bulgaria || Decision (Unanimous) || 3 || 3:00
|-
|-  style="background:#cfc"
| 2021-12-03 || Win ||align=left| Assane Bafeta || SENSHI 10 || Varna, Bulgaria || KO (Left hook) || 2 ||
|-
|-  style="background:#cfc"
| 2021-07-10 || Win ||align=left| Samuel Dbili || SENSHI 9 || Varna, Bulgaria || Decision (Unanimous) || 3 || 3:00
|-
|-  style="background:#cfc"
| 2021-02-27 || Win ||align=left| Aleksander Menković || SENSHI 7 || Varna, Bulgaria || KO (Head kick) || 3 || 
|-
! style=background:white colspan=9 |
|-
|-  style="background:#cfc"
| 2020-08-21 || Win ||align=left| Daniel Manole || SENSHI 6 || Varna, Bulgaria || KO (Spinning back kick) || 1 || 0:40
|-
|-  style="background:#cfc"
| 2020-02-01 || Win ||align=left| Guillermo Blokland || Battle Of Barock || Fulda, Germany || Decision (Unanimous) || 3 ||3:00
|-
|-  style="background:#cfc"
| 2019-12-07 || Win ||align=left| Brice Kombou || Mix Fight Championship 27, -77 kg Tournament Finals|| Frankfurt, Germany || KO (Head kick) || 3 || 1:41
|-
! style=background:white colspan=9 |
|-
|-  style="background:#cfc"
| 2019-12-07 || Win ||align=left| Lukasz Plawecki || Mix Fight Championship 27, -77 kg Tournament Semifinals || Frankfurt, Germany || KO (Head kick) || 3 || 1:41
|-
|-  style="background:#cfc"
| 2019-10-26 || Win ||align=left| Mustafa Genc || CWS Fight Night 5|| Neu-Ulm, Germany || Decision (Unanimous) || 3 || 3:00
|-
|-  style="background:#fbb"
| 2019-06-22 || Loss||align=left| Juri De Sousa || Mix Fight Championship 26|| Kassel, Germany || Decision (Unanimous) || 3 || 3:00
|-
|-  style="background:#cfc"
| 2019-05-11 || Win ||align=left| Stipe Mrsic || Fightarena 5 || Heilbronn, Germany || TKO (Punches) || 1 ||
|-
|-  style="background:#cfc"
| 2019-04-20 || Win ||align=left| Akira Umemura || Senshi 2 || Varna, Bulgaria || Decision (Unanimous) || 3 || 3:00
|-
|-  style="background:#cfc"
| 2019-02-23 || Win ||align=left| Hamza Sivro || Super Cup Kickboxing || Erzhausen, Germany || TKO (Punches) || 2 || 2:59
|-
! style=background:white colspan=9 |
|-
|-  style="background:#fbb"
| 2018-12-01 || Loss ||align=left| Arian Sadikovic || Mix Fight Championship 25 || Poland || Decision (Split) || 3 || 3:00
|-
|-  style="background:#fbb"
| 2018-04-21 || Loss ||align=left| Shkodran Veseli || Enfusion 64 || Dillingen, Germany || TKO || 1 ||  3:00
|-
|-  style="background:#fbb"
| 2018-03-09 || Loss ||align=left| Yohan Lidon || DSF Kickboxing Challenge 13 || Poland || KO (Front Kick to the Body) || 2 || 
|-
|-  style="background:#cfc"
| 2017-12-02 || Win ||align=left| Bartosz Zajac || Mix Fight Championship 23 || Frankfurt, Germany || Decision (Unanimous) || 3 || 3:00

|-  bgcolor="#CCFFCC"
| 2017-10-07 || Win ||align=left|  Ramon Kubler || Enfusion Live 54 || Ludwigsburg, Germany || Decision (Unanimous) || 3 || 3:00

|-  style="background:#fbb"
| 2017-05-06 || Loss ||align=left| Regian Eersel || Mix Fight Gala 21, -78.5 kg Tournament Finals|| Heilbronn, Germany || KO (Liver shot) || 1 ||
|-
! style=background:white colspan=9 |
|-
|-  style="background:#cfc"
| 2017-05-06 || Win ||align=left| Akam Tarageh || Mix Fight Gala 21, -78.5 kg Tournament Semifinals || Heilbronn, Germany || Decision (Unanimous) || 3 ||3:00
|-
|-  style="background:#cfc"
| 2016-12-03 || Win ||align=left| Philipp Hafeli || Wu Lin Feng 2016: WLF x Mix Fight Gala 20 - China vs Europe || China || TKO || 2 ||
|-
|-  style="background:#fbb"
| 2016-10-16 || Loss||align=left| Islam Beibatyrov || ACB KB 8: Only The Braves || Hoofddorp, Netherlands || KO (Punch) || 3 ||
|-
|-  style="background:#cfc"
| 2016-09-17 || Win ||align=left| Alexander Schmitt || It's Fight Time 3 || Darmstadt, Germany || KO (Spinning heel kick) || 3 ||
|-
|-  style="background:#fbb"
| 2016-06-13 || Loss ||align=left| Volodymyr Artemenko || Welcome to the East || Erfurt, Germany || Decision (Split) || 3 || 3:00

|-  style="background:#fbb"
| 2016-04-28 || Loss ||align=left| Alim Ozhev || Tatneft Cup, -80 kg Tournament  || Kazan, Russia || Decision || 3 || 3:00

|-  style="background:#cfc"
| 2015-10-16 || Win ||align=left| Dorin Stan || ACB KB 3: Grand Prix Final || Sibiu, Romania || Decision (Unanimous) || 3 ||3:00
|-
|-  style="background:#cfc"
| 2015-06-05 || Win ||align=left| Alexandros Chatzichronoglou || Mix Fight Gala || Fulda, Germany || Decision || 3 ||3:00
|-
|-  style="background:#fbb"
| 2015-04-29 || Loss ||align=left| Timur Aylyarov || Tatneft Cup, -80 kg Tournament Quarter Final || Kazan, Russia || Decision (Unanimous) || 3 ||3:00
|-
|-  style="background:#fbb"
| 2015-03-21 || Loss ||align=left| Ertugrul Bayrak || Night of the Champions 3 || Frankfurt, Germany || Decision || 3 ||3:00
|-
|-  style="background:#cfc"
| 2015-02-21 || Win ||align=left| Matous Kohout || Tatneft Cup, -80 kg Tournament Opening Round || Kazan, Russia || KO (Liver shot) || 2 || 1:09
|-
|-  style="background:#fbb"
| 2014-10-04 || Loss ||align=left| Darryl Sichtman || Mix Fight Gala XVI || Fulda, Germany || KO ||  ||
|-
|-  style="background:#cfc"
| 2014-04-07 || Win ||align=left| Taylan Yesil || Apache Fight Night || Aschaffenburg, Germany || Decision (Unanimous) || 5 || 3:00
|-
! style=background:white colspan=9 |
|-
|-  style="background:#cfc"
| 2014-03-17 || Win ||align=left| Ertugrul Bayrak || Night of the Champions || Fulda, Germany || TKO (Injury) || 2 ||3:00
|-
! style=background:white colspan=9 |
|-
|-  style="background:#cfc"
| 2013-10-01 || Win ||align=left| Lorand Sachs || Apache Fight Night || Fulda, Germany || KO (Head kick) || 2 ||
|-
! style=background:white colspan=9 |
|-
|-  style="background:#cfc"
| 2013-06-07 || Win ||align=left| Daniel Dörrer || Steko Fight Night || Munchen, Germany || Decision (Unanimous) || 3 || 3:00
|-
|-  style="background:#cfc"
| 2013-03-09|| Win ||align=left| Denis Liebau || Apache Fight Night || Frankfurt, Germany || KO (Spinning back kick) || 1 ||
|-
! style=background:white colspan=9 |
|-
|-  style="background:#cfc"
| 2012-10-06 || Win ||align=left| Mohammad Reza Farohi || Fight Factory || Waldkirch, Germany || KO (Head kick) || 2 || 1:30
|-
! style=background:white colspan=9 |
|-
| colspan=9 | Legend:

See also
List of male kickboxers

References

Living people
1989 births
German male kickboxers
People from Fulda
Middleweight kickboxers
Welterweight kickboxers
Glory kickboxers